Boulder Wash is an ephemeral stream or wash in Clark County, Nevada. Its mouth is at its confluence with the Boulder Wash Cove of Lake Mead at an elevation  at when Lake Mead is at its full level. It flows down a canyon into the upper Pinto Valley southwestward before turning southeastward to Boulder Wash Cove.

History
Boulder Wash was part of the original 1829 Armijo Route of the Old Spanish Trail along the Colorado River, between the mouth of the Virgin River and mouth of Las Vegas Wash. That trail route bypassed the deep narrow gorge of Boulder Canyon through the Black Mountains by way of Boulder Wash, Pinto Valley and Cottonwood Spring to upper Callville Wash which it then followed down to the river.   Boulder Wash was a tributary of the Colorado River until the construction of Hoover Dam and the formation of Lake Mead.

References

Boulder Wash
Rivers of Clark County, Nevada
Lake Mead
Washes of Nevada
Boulder Wash
Old Spanish Trail (trade route)